Ben Osmo is an Australian Production Sound Mixer. He is recipient of an Academy Award, three AACTA Awards and an honorary Australian Centenary Medal 2001. He is best known for his works Dead Calm (1989), Strictly Ballroom (1991) and Mad Max: Fury Road, which earned him the Academy Award for Best Sound Mixing at the 88th Academy Awards alongside Chris Jenkins and Gregg Rudloff.

Filmography

  2015: Women He's Undressed (documentary)
  2015: Mad Max: Fury Road
  2014: Devil's Playground
  2012: The Sapphires
  2011: Shelling Peas (Short)
  2011: Sleeping Beauty 
  2009: The Boys Are Back
  2008: Newcastle
  2008: The Black Balloon
  2006: Monarch Cove
  2006: Charlotte's Web
  2003: Fuel (Short)
  2003: Peter Pan
  2003: Danny Deckchair
  2002: The Nugget
  2002: Rabbit-Proof Fence
  2001: The Man Who Sued God
  2001: He Died with a Felafel in His Hand
  2001: Crocodile Dundee in Los Angeles
  2000: The Monkey's Mask
  1999: Holy Smoke!
  1998: Babe: Pig in the City
  1997: Oscar and Lucinda
  1997: Robinson Crusoe
  1996: The Phantom
  1995: Babe
  1995: Operation Dumbo Drop
  1994: Country Life
  1993: The Custodian
  1992: Lorenzo's Oil
  1992: The Last Days of Chez Nous
  1992: Strictly Ballroom
  1992: Turtle Beach
  1990: Prisoners of the Sun
  1989: Bangkok Hilton (3 episodes)
  1989: Dead Calm
  1988: Emerald City
  1988: The Clean Machine
  1987: HighTide
  1987: Peter Kenna's The Good Wife
  1984: Crime of the Decade
  1984: Kindred Spirits
  1983: Scales of Justice
  1976: No Fences, No Boundaries: Walter Burley Griffin
  1975: Double Dealer

Awards and nominations

 2001: Australian Centenary Medal 2001 – Honorary (2001)
 1989: AACTA Award for Best Sound – Dead Calm (won)
 1991: AACTA Award for Best Sound – Strictly Ballroom (nom)
 2007: The Zig Zag Lane IF Award for Best Sound – The Black Balloon (nom)
 2015: AACTA Award for Best Sound – Mad Max: Fury Road (won)
 2015: BAFTA Award for Best Sound – Mad Max: Fury Road (pending)
 2015: Satellite Award for Best Sound – Mad Max: Fury Road (pending)
 2016: Academy Award for Best Sound – Mad Max: Fury Road (Won)

References

External links

Living people
Australian audio engineers
Best Sound Mixing Academy Award winners
Year of birth missing (living people)